Stanislav Fajstavr (born 6 May 1943) was a Czech biathlete. He competed in the 20 km individual event at the 1972 Winter Olympics.

References

External links
 

1943 births
Living people
Czech male biathletes
Olympic biathletes of Czechoslovakia
Biathletes at the 1972 Winter Olympics
People from Semily District
Sportspeople from the Liberec Region